The Mediterranean barbel or southern barbel (''Barbus meridionalis') is a species of ray-finned fish in the  family Cyprinidae. It is found in France and Spain. It is one of the tastiest river fish, prized for its delicate texture and succulent flavor.

Its natural habitats are rivers and intermittent rivers. It is becoming rare due to habitat loss.

References 

Barbus
Cyprinid fish of Europe
Fish described in 1827
Taxonomy articles created by Polbot